The 1916 Bodmin by-election was held on 15 August 1916.  The by-election was held due to the resignation of the incumbent Liberal Unionist MP, Sir Reginald Pole-Carew.  It was won by the Conservative candidate Charles Hanson who was unopposed due to a War-time electoral pact.

References

1916 elections in the United Kingdom
1916 in England
August 1916 events
Bodmin
By-elections to the Parliament of the United Kingdom in Cornish constituencies
Unopposed by-elections to the Parliament of the United Kingdom (need citation)
1910s in Cornwall